A Christmas Gift to You is the second Christmas album by Canadian country music artist Johnny Reid. It was released on October 22, 2013 by Universal Music Canada. The album was produced by Bob Ezrin. It features collaborations with Peter Frampton and Isabelle Boulay.

It won the 2014 Juno Award for Adult Contemporary Album of the Year.

Commercial performance
In its first week of release, the album debuted at number seven on the Canadian Albums Chart. In the week of December 18, 2013, the album sold 18,000 copies, peaking at number two behind Beyoncé Knowles's self-titled album.

As of January 10, 2014, the album has sold 106,000 copies in Canada.

Track listing

Charts and certifications

Weekly charts

Year-end charts

Certifications

References

2013 Christmas albums
Johnny Reid albums
Universal Music Canada albums
Albums produced by Bob Ezrin
Christmas albums by Canadian artists
Country Christmas albums
Canadian Country Music Association Top Selling Canadian Album albums
Juno Award for Adult Contemporary Album of the Year albums